Pseudoclavibacter chungangensis is a Gram-positive and non-spore-forming bacterium from the genus Pseudoclavibacter which has been isolated from activated sludge from Cheonan in Korea.

References

Microbacteriaceae
Bacteria described in 2010